Hunt is the given name of:

 Hunt Downer (born 1946), American politician and major general
 Hunt Emerson (born 1952), British cartoonist
 Hunt Hawkins, American poet
 Hunt Sales (born 1954), American rock and roll drummer
 Hunt Slonem (born 1951), American painter, sculptor, and printmaker
 Hunt Stromberg (1894–1968), Hollywood film producer
 Hunt Walsh (1720–1795), British general and Member of the Parliament of Ireland
 Hunt Stockwell, fictional character in the TV series The A-Team,  played by Robert Vaughn